Volochaevsk ( - rendered as Воʌочаевск on the ship using the alternative Cyrillic el) was a Hansa A Type cargo ship which was built as Weserwald in 1943 by Deutsche Werft, Hamburg, Germany for Norddeutsche Lloyd, Hamburg. She was seized as a prize of war in 1945, passing to the Ministry of War Transport and renamed Empire Galveston. She was allocated to the Soviet Union in 1946 and was renamed Volochaevsk. She served until 1973, when she was scrapped.

Description

The engine was built by Deutsche Werft.

History
Weserwald was a Hansa A Type cargo ship built in 1943 as yard number 430 by Deutsche Werft, Hamburg, Germany for Hansa Line, Bremen, Germany. She was launched on 20 November 1943 and completed on 27 January 1944. Her port of registry was Hamburg.

In May 1945, Weserwald was seized as a prize of war at Flensburg. She was passed to the Ministry of War Transport and was renamed Empire Galveston. The Code Letters GYMW and United Kingdom Official Number 180874 were allocated. Her port of registry was London and she was operated under the management of Fred Nicholls & Son.

In 1946,Empire Galveston was allocated to the Soviet Union and was renamed Volochaevsk. Her port of registry was Tallinn and the Code Letters UKEJ were allocated. She was operated under the management of the Estonian Shipping Company. With their introduction in the 1960s, She was allocated the IMO Number 5383392. Volochaevsk served until 1973, when she was scrapped in the Soviet Union.

References

1943 ships
Ships built in Hamburg
World War II merchant ships of Germany
Steamships of Germany
Empire ships
Ministry of War Transport ships
Merchant ships of the United Kingdom
Steamships of the United Kingdom
Merchant ships of the Soviet Union
Steamships of the Soviet Union